Rotherham United Women Football Club is an English women's football club based in Rotherham, South Yorkshire.

History
The club was formed in 1969 as Kilnhurst Shooting Stars. The club has played in the Women's FA Cup on several occasions.

Ahead of season 2010–11, manager Paul Durrands boosted his squad with a number of players from FA WSL clubs Doncaster Rovers Belles and Lincoln Ladies. Shortly after joining from Lincoln, winger Paige Crossman was called up to the England U19 squad. After leading the table for much of the campaign, a late-season slump saw the Lady Millers miss out on automatic promotion. But victories over Sheffield Wednesday and Newcastle United in the play-offs secured a return to the Premier League Northern Division after two years away.

Season by season record

Stadium
Rotherham United Ladies play at Roundwood Sports Complex in Rawmarsh, the home of Parkgate F.C.

Honours 

 Midland Combination Women's Football League:
 Winners (1): 2006–07

References

Women's football clubs in England
Rotherham United F.C.
Football clubs in South Yorkshire
Sport in Rotherham
1969 establishments in England
FA Women's National League teams
Sheffield & Hallamshire County FA members